Salkadeh (also Romanized as Sa‘lkadeh; also known as Sa‘lgadah) is a village in Rahal Rural District, in the Central District of Khoy County, West Azerbaijan Province, Iran. At the 2006 census, its population was 979, in 206 families.

References 

Populated places in Khoy County